George Gifford may refer to:
George Gifford (Puritan) (c. 1548–1600), Puritan preacher
George Gifford (by 1502-43 or later), Member of Parliament (MP) for Midhurst
George Gifford (died 1557) (by 1496–1557), MP for Buckingham
George Gifford (died 1613) (1552–1613), MP for Morpeth and Cricklade
George Gifford (cricketer) (1891–1972), English cricketer

See also
George Gifford Symes (1840–1893), U.S. Representative
George Giffard (1886–1964), British military officer
George Markham Giffard (1813–1870), English barrister and judge